Cool World is a 1992 animated film directed by Ralph Bakshi.

Cool World may also refer to:

 Cool World (soundtrack), from the 1992 film
 Cool World (1992 video game), adapted from the film
 Cool World (Nintendo Entertainment System video game), also adapted from the film
 Cool World (Super Nintendo Entertainment System video game), also adapted from the film
 "Cool World" (song), a 1981 song by Australian band Mondo Rock
 The Cool World (novel), written by Warren Miller
 The Cool World (play), adapted from the novel
 The Cool World (film), 1963 film adaptation of the novel and play directed by Shirley Clarke
 The Cool World (soundtrack), a 1964 soundtrack album from the 1963 film, by Dizzy Gillespie